The Silent Partner is a 1979 soundtrack album composed by Oscar Peterson, for the 1978 film The Silent Partner.

Track listing
All compositions by Oscar Peterson
 "Theme for Celine" - 7:43
 "The Happy Hour" - 5:01
 "Party Time U.S.A." - 4:50
 "First Reprise on Theme for Celine" - 2:56
 "Elliot (The Silent Partner)" - 7:27
 "Theme for Susannah" - 4:07
 "Blues for Chris (The Fox)" - 5:57
 "Second Reprise on Theme for Celine" - 3:33

Personnel

Performance
 Oscar Peterson – piano
 Benny Carter – alto saxophone
 Zoot Sims – tenor saxophone
 Clark Terry – flugelhorn
 Milt Jackson – vibraphone
 John Heard – double bass
 Grady Tate – drums

References

Albums produced by Norman Granz
1979 soundtrack albums
Oscar Peterson soundtracks